Aim for the Heart is the second and final album from the American country music trio The Remingtons. Released in April 1993 on BNA Entertainment, the album produced two singles on the Billboard country singles charts: "Nobody Loves You When You're Free" at No. 52 and "Wall Around Her Heart" at No. 69. "Everything I Own" is a cover of a song originally recorded by Bread on their 1972 album Baby, I'm a Want You, and "Ride 'Em Cowboy" was a single for Paul Davis in 1974.

For this album, Denny Henson had replaced Rick Yancey as the band's third vocalist, although Yancey still played acoustic guitar on "Everything I Own" and co-wrote several songs on the album.

Critical reception

Roch Parisien of Allmusic wrote that "I honestly can't say that anything here improves on last year's debut...But if the idea of Bread with pedal steel meets the quieter side of The Desert Rose Band appeals to you..." Entertainment Weekly critic Alanna Nash rated the album "F", writing that "Imagine if three of the blandest pretenders to the country-music throne formed a band to record covers of past hits and write instantly forgettable country-pop radio fare."

Track listing
"I'm Gonna Find a Way" (Jimmy Griffin, Richard Mainegra, Rick Yancey) – 2:07
"Nobody Loves You When You're Free" (Griffin, Mainegra, Yancey) – 3:10
"I Can't Say That Anymore" (Terry Brown, Casey Kelly, Curtis Wayne) – 3:29
"Ride 'Em Cowboy" (Paul Davis) – 3:22
"Everything I Own" (David Gates) – 3:11
"It's Time to Shine" (Mainegra, Rick Bowles) – 2:58
"Lucky Boy" (Robb Royer) – 3:05
"Wall Around Her Heart" (Denny Henson, Steven K. Wilson) – 4:03
"Some Hearts" (Mainegra, Kelly, Tom Campbell) – 3:18
"She's All I've Got Going Now" (Griffin, Mainegra, Yancey) – 3:51

Personnel
Compiled from Aim for the Heart liner notes.
The Remingtons
 Jimmy Griffin - lead vocals ("I'm Gonna Find a Way", "Ride 'Em Cowboy", "Lucky Boy", "Everything I Own", and "She's All I've Got Going Now"); background vocals (all other tracks); acoustic guitar
 Denny Henson - lead vocals ("Nobody Loves You When You're Free" and "Wall Around Her Heart"); background vocals (all other tracks)
 Richard Mainegra - lead vocals ("I Can't Say That Anymore", "Some Hearts", and "It's Time to Shine"); background vocals (all other tracks); acoustic guitar

Additional musicians
 Eddie Bayers - drums, percussion
 Sam Bush - fiddle, mandolin
 Bill Cuomo - synthesizer
 Dan Dugmore - steel guitar
 Rob Hajacos - fiddle
 Bernie Leadon - acoustic guitar
 Craig Krampf - drums, percussion
 Josh Leo - acoustic guitar, electric guitar
 George Marinelli Jr. - electric guitar
 Steve Nathan - piano, synthesizer, Hammond B-3 organ, accordion
 Michael Rhodes - bass guitar
 Biff Watson - acoustic guitar
 Lonnie Wilson - drums, percussion
 Glenn Worf - bass guitar
 Rick Yancey - acoustic guitar on "Everything I Own"

Personnel
Jeff Giedt - recording
Larry Michael Lee - production
Josh Leo - production
Steve Marcantonio - recording, mixing
Denny Purcell - mastering

References

1993 albums
BNA Records albums
The Remingtons albums
Albums produced by Josh Leo